An, King of Han (Chinese: 韩王安; pinyin: Hán Wáng Ān) (died 226 BCE), ancestral name Jì (姬), clan name Hán (韩), personal name Ān (安), was the ruler of the State of Han between 238 BC and 230 BC. He was the son of King Huanhui of Han. 

In 233 BCE, King An sent Han Fei to Qin to request to be a vassal. However, Han Fei was executed. In 231 BCE, King An offered Nanyang (南阳), an area around modern day Mount Wangwu, to Qin. In the 9th month of the same year, Qin sent Neishi Teng (内史腾) to receive the area. 

In the following year (230 BCE), Qin sent Neishi Teng to attack Han. King An was captured and the State of Han ceased to exist. Qin then created Yingchuan Commandery from conquered Han territory.

In 226 BCE, ex-Han nobility launched a failed rebellion, and An died the same year.

Ancestors

References

226 BC deaths
Zhou dynasty nobility
Monarchs of Han (state)
Year of birth unknown